Nectandra caudatoacuminata is a species of plant in the family Lauraceae. It is endemic to Haiti.

References

caudatoacuminata
Endemic flora of Haiti
Taxonomy articles created by Polbot